Tekadi is a census town in Nagpur district in the Indian state of Maharashtra.

Demographics
 India census, Tekadi had a population of 17,179. Males constitute 53% of the population and females 47%. Tekadi has an average literacy rate of 74%, higher than the national average of 59.5%: male literacy is 80%, and female literacy is 68%. In Tekadi, 11% of the population is under 6 years of age.

References

Cities and towns in Nagpur district

वनवासाचा वेळेस प्रभु राम सीता व लक्ष्मण यांनी तीन प्रहर येथे मुक्काम केले होते. असे अयोध्येचा माहितीनुसार  कळते.